Magnar Ingebrigtsli (11 November 1932 – 10 September 2001) was a Norwegian cross-country skier and biathlete.

He was born in Rindal, and represented IK Rindals-Troll. He competed at the 1956 Winter Olympics in Cortina d'Ampezzo, where he placed 30th in the 15 km cross-country skiing.

He became Norwegian champion in biathlon in 1961.

Cross-country skiing results

Olympic Games

References

External links

1932 births
2001 deaths
Sportspeople from Møre og Romsdal
People from Rindal
Cross-country skiers at the 1956 Winter Olympics
Norwegian male cross-country skiers
Olympic cross-country skiers of Norway
20th-century Norwegian people